Scott Clayton and Adil Shamasdin were the defending champions but only Shamasdin chose to defend his title, partnering Purav Raja. Shamasdin lost in the first round to Antonio Šančić and Tristan-Samuel Weissborn.

Benjamin Bonzi and Antoine Hoang won the title after defeating Simone Bolelli and Florin Mergea 6–3, 6–2 in the final.

Seeds

Draw

References

External links
 Main draw

Teréga Open Pau-Pyrénées - Doubles